Cadmium bromide is the inorganic compound with the formula CdBr2.  It is a white hygroscopic solid.  It also can be obtained as a mono- and tetrahydrate. It has few applications.

Preparation
Cadmium bromide is prepared by heating cadmium with bromine vapor.

References

Cadmium compounds
Bromides
Metal halides
Photographic chemicals